Ueno Dam (上野ダム) is a concrete gravity dam in the Gunma Prefecture of Japan. The dam serves as the lower reservoir of the Kannagawa Hydropower Plant. Because of the dams remote location deep in the hillside, no houses were submerged.

Dams in Gunma Prefecture
Dams completed in 2004
Gravity dams